An assistant United States attorney (AUSA) is an official career civil service position in the U.S. Department of Justice composed of lawyers working under the U.S. Attorney of each U.S. federal judicial district. They represent the federal government of the United States in civil and appellate litigation and in federal criminal prosecutions. Assistant U.S. attorneys working in their office's criminal section are often called federal prosecutors.

Federal prosecutors are rarely hired directly out of law school as it's not considered an entry-level position. Federal prosecutors often have significant trial experience from state courts before entering the U.S. Attorneys Office. In 2008, there were approximately 5,800 assistant United States attorneys employed by the United States Government.  they earned a starting base salary of $55,204, which may be significantly adjusted for their local cost of living and increases with years of experience up to a maximum of $176,200.

Special Assistant United States Attorney
Federal law authorizes the Attorney General to appoint Special Assistant U.S. Attorneys, known as SAUSAs, "to  assist  United  States  attorneys when the public interest so requires."
In addition to designating non- federal employees, the SAUSA designation is also given to prosecutors who are employed by another agency, such as the Social Security Administration, United States Postal Service, or Federal Bureau of Investigation, but work alongside AUSAs because of their expertise. They are paid by that agency and seconded to the United States Attorneys Office for a set period of time. This designation may also be given to an AUSA who is seconded to a different district or from Main Justice to a specific office. Appointing local prosecutors or enforcement attorneys to assist in a joint investigation and prosecution has been criticized for having the potential for conflicts of interest, selective and vindictive prosecution, as well as dual and successive prosecution.
Uncompensated SAUSAs can also be unpaid volunteers; the positions carry the same duties as assistant United States attorneys but are typically held by young lawyers seeking to establish "professional credibility".

See also

 Special counsel
 United States Attorney General
 United States Department of Justice

References